
Gmina Czerwin is a rural gmina (administrative district) in Ostrołęka County, Masovian Voivodeship, in east-central Poland.

Villages
Gmina Czerwin contains the villages and settlements of Andrzejki-Tyszki, Bobin, Borek, Buczyn, Choromany-Witnice, Chruśnice, Czerwin, Dąbek, Damiany, Dzwonek, Filochy, Gocły, Grodzisk Duży, Grodzisk-Wieś, Gumki, Janki Młode, Jarnuty, Księżopole, Łady-Mans, Laski Szlacheckie, Laski Włościańskie, Nowe Dobki, Nowe Malinowo, Piotrowo, Piski, Pomian, Seroczyn, Skarżyn, Sokołowo, Stare Dobki, Stare Malinowo, Stylągi, Suchcice, Tomasze, Tyszki-Ciągaczki, Tyszki-Gostery, Tyszki-Nadbory, Wiśniewo, Wiśniówek, Wojsze, Wólka Czerwińska, Wólka Seroczyńska, Załuski, Zaorze and Żochy.

Neighbouring gminas
Gmina Czerwin is bordered by the gminas of Goworowo, Ostrów Mazowiecka, Rzekuń, Śniadowo, Stary Lubotyń, Troszyn and Wąsewo.

References

Polish official population figures 2006

Czerwin
Ostrołęka County